Events in the year 1936 in Belgium.

Incumbents

Monarch: Leopold III
Prime Minister: Paul van Zeeland

Events
 January – Remains of Father Damien shipped to Belgium for reburial
 24 May – Legislative elections
 7 June – Provincial elections
 DeVlag (Deutsch-Vlämische Arbeitsgemeinschaft) founded to facilitate cultural exchange with Nazi Germany

Publications
 Emmanuel d'Hooghvorst, J’accuse Léon Degrelle
 Maurice Grevisse, Le Bon Usage
 Hergé, Le Lotus bleu (serialised 1934–35) published as an album 
 Charles Plisnier, Mariages
 Georges Simenon, 45° à l'ombre, Les Demoiselles de Concarneau, L'Évadé, Long Cours
 Felix Timmermans, Het Vlaamsche volksleven volgens Pieter Breughel

Art
 Paul Delvaux, Le Miroir, Femme dans une grotte, La Fenêtre, La Rose, Les Belles de nuit, Le Cortège des dentelles
 René Magritte's first solo exhibition in the United States (Julien Levy Gallery, New York)

Births
 10 January – Lucienne Stassaert, poet
 19 April – Wilfried Martens, prime minister (died 2013)
 24 May – Patrick Nothomb, diplomat (died 2020)
 6 July – Grand Jojo, singer-songwriter (died 2021)
 7 November – Roger Vangheluwe, sexual abuser
 25 December – Marnix Vincent, literary translator (died 2016)

Deaths

 3 January – Jules Destrée (born 1863), socialist
 25 February – Anna Boch (born 1848), painter
 5 March – Georges Hobé (born 1854), architect
 8 May – Paul Spaak (born 1871), poet
 16 September – Pol Demade (born 1863), writer
 11 October – Joseph Jacquemotte (born 1883), anarcho-syndicalist

References

 
1930s in Belgium